El Especialito is a free Spanish language weekly newspaper magazine, which was originally published under the name of El Especial in the 1980s and renamed in the 1990s. It was founded by Cuban American entrepreneur Antonio Ibarria and is distributed by United States Distributions Inc in northeastern New Jersey, New York City and Miami.

El Especialito is distributed more than 5,500 yellow news racks in thirteen independent zones. With a weekly publication of 250,000 copies reaching more than one million readers, it the largest Hispanic weekly in the US.

El Especialito is part of Ibarria Media Group, which employees ninety employees and operates as family business run by Ibarria and his two sons, Anthony and John. The group also publishes the paid weeklies El Especial NY/NJ and El Especial Miami, as well as the celebrity newspaper Personalidades. Ibarria has been commended for his contributions to the community of Hispanics, including having a street named for him.

See also

List of newspapers in New Jersey
List of Spanish-language newspapers published in the United States
Havana on the Hudson
Media in New York City
El Diario La Prensa

References

External links
Spanish-language Journalism in the United States
El Especial

Hispanic and Latino American culture in New York City
Non-English-language newspapers published in New Jersey
Spanish-language newspapers published in New York (state)
Hispanic and Latino American culture in New Jersey
Mass media in Hudson County, New Jersey
Union City, New Jersey
North Hudson, New Jersey
Free newspapers
Spanish-language mass media in New Jersey
Publications established in 1985
Spanish-language newspapers published in Florida
1985 establishments in the United States